Jakub Bartkowski (born 7 November 1991) is a Polish professional footballer who plays as a right-back for Lechia Gdańsk.

External links

References

1991 births
Living people
Footballers from Łódź
Association football defenders
Polish footballers
Poland youth international footballers
Poland under-21 international footballers
Ekstraklasa players
I liga players
II liga players
III liga players
Widzew Łódź players
Wigry Suwałki players
Wisła Kraków players
Pogoń Szczecin players
Lechia Gdańsk players